Weaver Township is one of twelve townships in Humboldt County, Iowa, USA. As of the 2000 census, its population was 508.

History
Weaver Township was organized in 1874. It was named for John N. Weaver, who gave a well-received speech on the Fourth of July, 1873.

Geography

Cities, towns, villages
Gilmore City, also partially in Pocahontas County
Pioneer, unincorporated community
Unique, former community that existed from 1879 to 1900, now unincorporated

Adjacent townships
 Avery Township (north)
 Rutland Township (northeast)
 Corinth Township (east)
 Deer Creek Township, Webster County (southeast)
 Jackson Township, Webster County (south)
 Lincoln Township, Calhoun County (southwest)
 Lake Township, Pocahontas County (west)
 Garfield Township, Pocahontas County (northwest)

Cemeteries
The township contains Weaver Township Cemetery and Marble Valley Cemetery.

Political districts
 Iowa's 4th congressional district
 State House District 4

References
 United States Census Bureau 2008 TIGER/Line Shapefiles
 United States Board on Geographic Names (GNIS)
 United States National Atlas

External links
 US-Counties.com
 City-Data.com

Townships in Humboldt County, Iowa
Townships in Iowa